Every Best Singles +3 is the first best of album of the Japanese pop group Every Little Thing, released on March 31, 1999. It is the first album of songs from the best selling singles from the band with 2,556,314 copies sold.

Track listing

Personnel
Artwork design – Keiichi Yamashita
Co-producer – Naoto Suzuki
Recording engineer – Masashi Hashimoto, Atsushi Hattori, Koji Morimoto
Executive producer – Max Matsuura
Guitar – Hidetoshi Suzuki (tracks 1, 4, 5)
Audio mastering - Eddy Schreyer
Mixed by – Brian Reeves, Dave Ford, Hitoshi Hiruma, Atsushi Hattori, Koji Morimoto
Advisory producer – Ryuzo Shoji, Yasuo Shibata
Executive supervisor – Katsuro Oshita
General producer – Shinji Hayashi
Specially coordinated by – Tom Yoda
Photography – Kunihiro Takuma
Assistant producer – Yuka Akiyama
Synthesizer programmed by – Genya Kuwajima
Backing vocals - Junko Hirotani (track 5)
Acoustic guitar - Kaoru Kato (track 7)
String arrangement - Jeremy Lubbock (track 11)

Chart positions

References

External links
 Every Best Singles +3 information at Avex Network.
 Every Best Singles +3 information at Tsutaya

1999 compilation albums
Every Little Thing (band) albums